Emilija Baranac (born August 4, 1994) is a Canadian actress and model. She is known for her portrayal of Midge Klump in The CW drama series Riverdale and as Genevieve in the To All the Boys I've Loved Before film series.

Life and career
Baranac was born in Vancouver, British Columbia to Serbian parents.

She portrayed Midge Klump in the second season of The CW's drama series Riverdale. Baranac also co-starred as Genevieve in the film adaptation of Jenny Han's young adult romance novel To All the Boys I've Loved Before.

Filmography

References

External links
 

1994 births
21st-century Canadian actresses
Actresses from Vancouver
Female models from British Columbia
Canadian film actresses
Canadian television actresses
Canadian people of Serbian descent
Living people